Agaronia acuminata, common name the pointed ancilla, is a species of sea snail, a marine gastropod mollusk in the family Olividae, the olive snails.

Subspecies
 Agaronia acuminata acuminata (Lamarck, 1811)
 Agaronia acuminata boavistensis Burnay & Conceicao, 1986

Description
The length of the shell varies between 30 mm and 80 mm.

Distribution
This species occurs in the Atlantic Ocean off Gabon, Angola and West Africa.

References 

 Teso V. & Pastorino G. (2011) A revision of the genus Olivancillaria (Mollusca: Olividae) from the southwestern Atlantic. Zootaxa 2889: 1–34

External links
 

Olividae
Molluscs of the Atlantic Ocean
Molluscs of Angola
Gastropods described in 1811